Haft Cheshmeh is a village in Arshaq-e Markazi Rural District, Arshaq District, Meshgin Shahr County, Ardabil Province, Iran. At the 2006 census, its population was 116, in 23 families.

References 

Tageo

Towns and villages in Meshgin Shahr County